The 1994–95 División de Honor de Fútbol Femenino was the seventh edition of Spain's women's football premier league. Ten teams took part in the competition, which took place from 19 September 1993 to 27 March 1994, with Anaitasuna and León replacing relegated teams Olímpico Fortuna and Athenas.

Añorga won its second title with 16 wins in 18 matches and an eight points difference over defending champion Oroquieta Villaverde. Espanyol, Sondika and Sabadell followed in the table. León and FFP Alcobendas were relegated as the two bottom teams, and Anaitasuna FT, which ended in mid-table, also asked for relegation.

During the last minutes of Week 5's Sondika–Oroquieta Villaverde match, which ended in a 0–3 away win, a brawl degenerated into a beating which resulted in three injured Oroquieta players. RFEF, whose attitude following the incident was harshly criticized by Oroquieta executives and players, sanctioned one player from each team plus Oroquieta's manager and closed Sondika's ground for one match.

Teams and locations

Final table

Results

References

1994-95
Spa
1
women